SHW may refer to:

Sharurah Domestic Airport, Sharurah, Saudi Arabia, IATA airport code SHW
Shawford railway station, England, National Rail station code SHW
Sherwin-Williams, NYSE stock symbol SHW
Sheung Wan station, Hong Kong, MTR station code SHW